Carlos Scott López, (Lopez-Gelormino; born Scott Gelormino, April 11, 1970) is a human rights attorney, clinical psychologist, epidemiologist, and public health advocate.  He worked with Bruce William Nickerson until Nickerson's death  on February 5, 2022.

Education
López received an AB with honors from Harvard University; an MBA and MA from Stanford University; a JD from Yale Law School with foci in public health and international human rights; and an MPsych and PhD from the University of New South Wales in clinical psychology.

Career
As a clinical psychologist (licensed in Australia) and attorney admitted to the New York Bar, California Bar, and U.S. Patent Bar, López has affiliated himself with attorneys addressing public health, pro bono, and international development projects.  In California, López worked closely with Bruce William Nickerson on a wide variety of anti-discrimination cases focused on the illegitimate—and illegal—criminal prosecution of LGBTQ people with a focus on addressing the trauma and psychological ailments which such clients faced.

López's focus on the cross-cultural dimensions of trauma and PTSD, public health/epidemiology, immigration,  and alternative dispute resolution (particularly mediation and arbitration) emerged in the early 1990s after teaching negotiation techniques at Harvard Law School with the late Prof. Roger Fisher, and assisting repatriated refugees as an officer with the United Nations Transitional Authority in Cambodia (UNTAC).

Publications 
In the early 2000s, López served as an Executive Editor of the Yale Human Rights & Development Law Journal, as well as an Editor of the Yale Journal of Law and Health and the Yale International Law Journal. In addition to writings and submissions in the context of his day-to-day work, López's scholarly, formal publications include articles addressing human rights; public health; intellectual property; and immigration law.

Critics 
Given López's critical and comparatively progressive stance towards public health rights, the fluidity of cross-cultural therapeutic psychological techniques, and complex dimensions of assessing stigma – particularly vis-à-vis HIV-AIDS – he has been viewed as overly idealistic.  His ideas about future political organizations, consultative community-based law reform, open immigration policies, and the natural transformation of nation-states into a global, unified federation of municipalities have also been considered somewhat naive.  López-Gelormino has countered that such developments will take time, and he has a very long-term time horizon, citing the German economist E.F. Schumacher as one of his leading inspirations.

References 

HIV/AIDS researchers
HIV/AIDS activists
United Nations officials
People in public health
1970 births
Living people
Yale Law School alumni
University of New South Wales alumni
Harvard College alumni

da:Scott Lopez-Gelormino
pt:Scott Lopez-Gelormino